Kamaraj College is one of the oldest Arts & Science Colleges in Tamil Nadu, having been established in the southern port city of Thoothukudi by various Hindu Charitable Organizations in the year 1966. The college has been named after the former chief minister of Tamil Nadu K. Kamaraj.

The college is run by the Tuticorin Educational Society, which also runs a Matriculation School and a women's college within the lush green campus. The campus covers an area of 50 acres and has a student strength of 5,000.

The college and society were founded by the late industrialist, Sri. AMMS Ganesa Nadar, managing director, The Tuticorin Spinning Mills Ltd, and Hindu Charitable organizations including Karapettai Hindu Nadar Sangam, for the noble purpose of upliftment of the Hindu community.

The innovative, research-oriented institution offers a variety of courses in business, commerce, arts and science with special courses on e-commerce, shipping & logistics, forensic science, visual communication, sports science, artificial intelligence and data science.

A total of 12 courses are offered under the govt-aided stream, with 29 courses offered under the self-financed stream. Together, there are 28 under-graduate courses, 13 post-graduate programs, and 9 research centers for doctoral studies.

The college is affiliated to Manonmaniam Sundaranar University, Tirunelveli, and is accredited with A+ grade by NAAC, with a CGPA of 3.31. MCA, a professional course offered by the college, is approved by the AITCE, New Delhi.

Courses Offered 
The college offers a wide variety of courses for its students

Bachelor's Programs 

* From Academic Year 2023-24

Master's Programs 

* From Academic Year 2023-24

PhD Research Programs 

* From Academic Year 2023-24

Scholarship Program 
The institution runs a robust scholarship program for deserving students. A 50% waiver in annual tuition fees are offered to all eligible candidates applying for the Aided and SF degree program.

Students can apply for scholarship under any one of the four categories;

Meritorious Students:

Scholarship cut-off for high mark achievers in +2 board exams

 92% and above in core subjects (for admission in SF courses)
 96% and above in core subjects (for admission in Aided courses)

Sports or Culturals achiever (District Level and above)

Financial Criteria: All students from government-run schools are eligible

(or)

Distress: Student whose parent has passed away (either Father or Mother)

Eligible students who apply are automatically granted scholarship

Departments

Arts & Humanities 

 Tamil
 English
 History
 Criminology

Commerce 

 Commerce
 Business 
 Economics

Science 

 Computer Science
 Mathematics
 Microbiology
 Chemistry
 Physics
 Zoology
 Botany
Visual Communication
Physical Education

Major Events during the Academic Year 
1. Academic Events

Various International, National and State-level Conferences, Seminars, Workshops and Exhibitions are organized by the respective departments. About 200 such programs are held every year in the college.

2. Celebrations

The college celebrates Independence Day, Republic Day, Pongal Day, Women's Day and Kamarajar's Birthday in a grand manner. Mini-cultural programs are generally held during these events celebrating the local tradition and culture

3. Sporting & Cultural Events

Three major Sporting and Cultural events are organized by the college every year.

Thamarabarani Trophy and Founder's Trophy are inter-departmental competitions held in odd and even semesters respectively. All 24 departments of the college participate in these competitions

Over 30 colleges and schools from all over Tamil Nadu participate in the annual Pongalovium Trophy inter-collegiate cum inter-school sports-cultural festival organized by the college

Campus Placement 
Campus Placement is an important avenue for career development of the students. About 250 students are placed via campus recruitment in the college. A wide range of reputed companies, from large Banking & Finance companies to ITES firms, Publishing companies to Core Manufacturing firms, visit the college every year for their requirements

Entrepreneurship Development 
A Business Incubation Centre has been established to assist the students to develop their entrepreneurial traits and enable them to become entrepreneurs straight out of college. The center is supported by the Faculty, Management and Alumni of the Institution. The centre, located within the college premises, provides working space, meeting rooms and secretarial services and add-on support like legal services, technology and IP related services.

Infrastructure 
Kamaraj College has been developed and is fully established with four Academic Blocks. Swami Vivekananda Block (Aided Courses)

 AMMS Ganesan Nadar Block (Aided Courses)
 Golden Jubilee Block (SF Courses)
 Computer Science Block (SF Courses)

The academic buildings house the Lecture Halls, fully-equipped Laboratories and air-conditioned Seminar Halls

The other campus buildings include:

 Admin Block
 Auditorium
 Marine Research Centre 
 Vinayagar Temple
 Canteen
 Boys Hostel Building
 Girls Hostel Building

The Admin building houses the Central Library, Business Incubation Centre, Research Centre, Alumni Centre, Chess Club, Principal's Office and Society Conference Hall. Marine Research Centre has interesting live sea-water animals on display.

The campus has various sporting facilities including a full-size Foot-ball Ground, Basket-ball Court, Kabaddi Ground and Kho-Kho ground.

Apart from the above, there is also a Matriculation School and a dedicated Women's College within the beautiful 50 acre campus

Affiliations & Accreditations 
The college is affiliated with Manonmanium Sundaranar University, Tirunelveli for its UG, PG, and PhD Programs. The professional MCA program offered by the institution is approved by AICTE, Delhi. The college is recognized by the University Grants Commission.

The college is accredited by NAAC with A+ Grade having achieved a CGPA of 3.31 on a scale of 4.

Alumni 
All students passing out of Kamaraj College automatically become members of their respective Department Alumni Association. The college has a thriving Alumni body. An Annual Alumni Meet is held every October in a grand manner at the college campus with various events and competitions. Alumni members extend their support in Student Placement and Business Incubation activities

References

Educational institutions established in 1966
1966 establishments in Madras State
Colleges affiliated to Manonmaniam Sundaranar University
Universities and colleges in Thoothukudi district